The Loud Mouth is a 1932 American pre-Code short comedy film directed by Del Lord. It was nominated for an Academy Award in 1932 for Best Short Subject (Comedy).

Cast
 Matt McHugh as Loud Mouth
 Marjorie Kane as Edith
 Franklin Pangborn as Freddie
 Ray Cooke as Swat Butler of Blue Sox
 Julia Griffith
 Fred Kelsey as Max, Manager of Blue Sox

References

External links

1932 films
1932 comedy films
1930s English-language films
American black-and-white films
Films directed by Del Lord
American comedy short films
Mack Sennett Comedies short films
1930s American films